Death on the Run (French: Les deux font la paire) is a 1954 French comedy film directed by  André Berthomieu  and starring  Jean Richard, Jean-Marc Thibault and Edith Georges. It is a remake of the 1936 film of the same title which Berthomieu had also directed.

It was shot at the Billancourt Studios in Paris. The film's sets were designed by the art director Raymond Nègre.

Synopsis
Two struggling actors attempt to make the headlines by pretending one of them has been murdered. However, events soon get out of hand.

Cast
   Jean Richard  as Achille Baluchet  
 Jean-Marc Thibault  as Hector Trignol  
 Edith Georges  as Myra  
 Fred Pasquali  as Le directeur du théâtre 
 Maurice Biraud  as L'avocat  
 Jacqueline Maillan  as Olga  
 Arthur Allan  as Ivan  
 Charles Bouillaud  as Le policier #1  
 Pierre Ferval  as Le policier #2  
 Paul Faivre  as Le gardien  
 Robert Destain  as Le juge d'instruction  
 Robert Rollis   as Pinard 
 Marcel Vibert  as Le président du tribunal  
 Hugues de Bagratide  as Le juge de Sergarie  
 René Bergeron  as Le procureur  
 Alexandre Mihalesco  as L'ordonnance  
 Robert Blome  as Le coiffeur  
 Sabine André   as La caissière  
 Jack Ary  as Un agent
 Jackie Sardou as The theatrical
 Bernard Dumaine 
 Gaston Orbal  as L'aliéniste #1
 Rivers Cadet  as L'aliéniste #2 
 Arthur Devère  as Le détective  
 Pauline Carton  as La concierge  
 Alice Tissot  as L'habilleuse

References

Bibliography 
 Parish, James Robert. Film Actors Guide: Western Europe. Scarecrow Press, 1977.

External links 
 

1954 films
1954 comedy films
French comedy films
1950s French-language films
Films directed by André Berthomieu 
Films shot at Billancourt Studios
Remakes of French films
French black-and-white films
1950s French films